Jack Charles Burns (born January 3, 1949) is a former American football coach whose career spanned 30 years at both the collegiate and professional levels. He served as an assistant coach in the National Football League (NFL) for 15 seasons, including stints with the Washington Redskins, Minnesota Vikings, and Atlanta Falcons. Burns was the offensive coordinator for the Vikings from 1992 to 1993 and part of the Redskins' 1991 Super Bowl championship team. At the college level, he most notably served as offensive coordinator at the University of Louisville under Howard Schnellenberger from 1985 until 1988.

He is the uncle of MLB player Billy Burns.

References

1949 births
Living people
Players of American football from Tampa, Florida
American football defensive backs
Florida Gators football players
Vanderbilt Commodores football coaches
Auburn Tigers football coaches
United States Football League coaches
Louisville Cardinals football coaches
Atlanta Falcons coaches
Florida Gators football coaches
Minnesota Vikings coaches
Texas Longhorns football coaches
Washington Redskins coaches